Physemus minutus is a species of minute marsh-loving beetle in the family Limnichidae. It is found in Central America and North America.

References

Further reading

 

Byrrhoidea
Articles created by Qbugbot
Beetles described in 1854